Louis E. Dieruff High School, typically referred to as Dieruff High School, is a large, urban public high school in Allentown, Pennsylvania. It is located at 815 North Irving Street in Allentown. The school serves students in grades nine through 12 from the eastern and southern parts of the city and is part of the Allentown School District.

As of 2021-22, the school had 1,880 students, according to National Center for Education Statistics data. Dieruff High School students may choose to attend Lehigh Career and Technical Institute for vocational training in the trades. The Carbon-Lehigh Intermediate Unit IU21 provides the district with a variety of specialized education services, including education for disabled students and hearing, speech and visual disability services and professional development for staff and faculty.

The school is named after Louis E. Dieruff, a noted educator in the Allentown School District. The school mascot is an Alaskan husky named "Kiska" in honor of ten men and women captured by the Japanese on the island of Kiska in 1942 during World War II, some of whom were Allentown servicemen.

History

Construction on Louis E. Dieruff High School began in 1958. The building was initially intended to serve as an Allentown School District junior high schoolntown's growing population. It opened in 1959. In 1965, the Allentown School District planetarium was added to the building. Additional classrooms and the East Branch of the Allentown Public Library (later closed and converted to classrooms) were built and added in 1970.

On September 7, 2008, just before 3pm, an EF1 about 50 yards in width touched down near the school, causing minor damage.

In 2009, under the Allentown School District's Comprehensive Facilities Plan, the school launched a $28 million renovation that included the addition of the Michael P. Meilinger wing in 2009, used mostly for freshman classes.

Student demographics
The school's class size is 19.28 students per teacher as of 2021-22 versus a Pennsylvania high school average of 15 students per teacher. The student ethnicity is 60% Hispanic, 22% White, 15% Black, 2% Asian & Pacific Islander, and less than 2% and Native American & Native Alaskan. 79% of students are eligible for a free or reduced-price lunch with the state average 33%.

Dieruff is one of two public high schools in Allentown and primarily serves students from the eastern part of the city. Allentown's other public high school, William Allen High School, was founded in 1858 as Allentown High School and serves students from the western and central parts of the city. Dieruff is the smaller of the two schools.

Student accomplishments

Dieruff High School has had many students who have won various individual awards and competitions, including:
First place, Scholastic Scrimmage: 1975
Second place, Scholastic Scrimmage: 1987
Three straight fourth place finishes in the Pennsylvania State "We The People" Competition in Philadelphia: 2005, 2006, and 2007
Olympiad of the Mind runners-up: 2005
Three straight first place finishes in the Midwest Regional JROTC Drill Competition in Galloway, Ohio
Air Force Reserve Officer Training Corps Drill Midwest Region Champions: 2004, 2005, and 2006
Two straight first place finishes in the Eastern Regional JROTC Drill Competition in Sewell, New Jersey: 2005 and 2006
AFJROTC Drill Northeast Region Champions: 2000, 2002, 2003, and 2006
Second place, Group 1A Marching Band, U.S. Scholastic Band Association's Yamaha Cup. "Best Percussion," and "Best Music" awards at Giants Stadium in East Rutherford, New Jersey: 2006
First place, Group 1A Marching Band, U.S. Scholastic Band Association's Yamaha Cup. Giants Stadium in East Rutherford, New Jersey: 2009
Dieruff's 2009 yearbook, The 'L Edition, was selected as a national sample and distributed to other schools as a sample of a good yearbook, and was also featured in a book displaying the best of the best from Taylor Publishing
Air Force National JROTC Drill Championship, 2nd place, Armed Regulation Drill: 2013
Air Force National JROTC Drill Championship, 3rd place, Commanders Trophy, George Lopez, Sean Lee, and Alexander Gómez: 2013

Planetarium
Amidst Cold War fears of science education inadequacy and a general interest in astronomy before the Moon landing, the Allentown School District erected a planetarium inside Dieruff High School in 1965.

Following an acrimonious budget debate in 1991, all programs that were deemed as "nonessential" were to be removed from the Allentown School District's budget, and public funding for the planetarium ended with its continued operation and upkeep left to private funding sources. In 2010, the planetarium was closed. The Allentown School District board approved a 2016-17 spending plan that added a number of teacher positions, including a planetarium director to reopen the shuttered planetarium at Dieruff High School, however the position was never filled and the Planetarium was never reopened. After an evaluation in September, the district administration determined it would have cost too much to reopen the planetarium and get it up and running.

Athletics

Dieruff High School competes athletically in the Eastern Pennsylvania Conference (EPC) in the District XI division of the Pennsylvania Interscholastic Athletic Association, one of the premier high school athletic divisions in the nation.

The school plays its home football, soccer, and field hockey games at J. Birney Crum Stadium, a 15,000 capacity stadium in Allentown that is the second largest high school stadium in Pennsylvania.

Athletic accomplishments
Boys basketball
1966: District XI Champions/East Penn Conference champions
1967: District XI Champions/East Penn Conference champions
1968: District XI Champions/East Penn Conference champions
1969: District XI champions
1974: East Penn Conference
1977: District XI champions/East Penn Conference champions
1978: East Penn Conference champions
1987: East Penn Conference champions
1988: East Penn Conference champions
1997: East Penn Conference champions

Girls basketball
1975: District XI champions - PIAA state champions
1976: - PIAA state champions
1983: District XI champions

Football::

1961: Lehigh Valley Big 6 champions
1964: Lehigh Valley Big 6 champions
1969: Lehigh Valley Big 8 tri-champions
1971: Lehigh Valley Big 6 champions
1977: East Penn Conference champions
1979: Undefeated champions (10-0-1), East Penn Conference.
1981: Tri-champions with (Emmaus High School and Whitehall High School), East Penn Conference
1992: East Penn Conference champions

Boys track and field
1982: undefeated champions (12-0)
1983: undefeated champions (12-0)

Mascot
The school's mascot, an Alaskan husky, is an actual husky dog named "Kiska VI" (now the sixth dog mascot so named by the school since 1959). The husky is named in honor of the ten men and women captured by the Japanese on Kiska Island in 1942 during World War II, some of whom were Allentown servicemen. Dieruff's teams are known as "Huskies".

Notable alumni
Joseph Atiyeh, former Olympic silver medalist, wrestling, 1984 Summer Olympics
Jeff Bleamer, former professional football player, New York Jets and Philadelphia Eagles
Rick Braun, smooth jazz musician
Eddie Mast, former professional basketball player, Atlanta Hawks and New York Knicks
Sally McNeil, former amateur bodybuilder, erotic wrestler, and murderer
Andre Reed, former professional football player, Buffalo Bills and Washington Redskins, and Pro Football Hall of Fame member
Bob Riedy, former professional basketball player, Houston Mavericks
Roman Urbanczuk, former professional soccer player, Cleveland Force, Pennsylvania Stoners, and Philadelphia Fever

Notable faculty and coaches
Eddie Mast (head basketball coach from 1983 to 1985), former professional basketball player, Atlanta Hawks and New York Knicks

Alma mater
Dieruff High School, be our stay, wearing proudly Blue and Gray! May we for thy spirit yearn; Help us e’er to seek and learn. Now, hail our Alma Mater strong And may we proudly say: To you we ever will belong! We salute you, Blue and Gray!
Though our days we'll ne'er forget, standards you have firmly set! Hon'ring you we'll always try to live alright o Dieruff high. Now, hail our Alma Mater strong And may we proudly say: To you we ever will belong! We salut you, Blue and Gray!

References

External links

Official website
Dieruff High School athletics official website
Dieruff High School on Facebook
Dieruff High School on Twitter
Dieruff High School profile at Niche
Dieruff High School sports coverage at The Express-Times

1959 establishments in Pennsylvania
Educational institutions established in 1959
Public high schools in Pennsylvania
Schools in Allentown, Pennsylvania